myThings is a site retargeting company that provides advertisers with display ads (banners), for visitors who have left their sites without completing a purchase. These users are served ads as they continue surfing the web. Behavioral retargeting is a form of online targeted advertising, in which online advertising is delivered to consumers based on their previous actions, such as pages browsed, products added to basket, on a company's website or app.

History 
Founded in 2005, myThings was originally created to "[help] people keep track of their belongings —when and where they were purchased, for how much, and the services provided with them— in order to replace or sell an item, or in the event of fire or theft." This is their current mission but it has closed for beta testing. For a period of time, it operated in the online and mobile display advertising and affiliate marketing industry. myThings has offices in the United States, the United Kingdom, Germany and Israel.
In 2010, myThings partnered with Affiliate Window to present the first CPA based affiliate retargeting solution on the market that integrates into advertisers' existing affiliate tags. The solution won the Econsultancy Award in Affiliate marketing in March 2011.

myThings was also shortlisted for the A4U awards in 4 categories: Affiliate Marketing innovation, Best 3rd party application, Best new entrant and Best retail advertiser. The company was recently nominated as one of the top 50 fastest growing digital media companies in Europe.

References

External links
 

Digital marketing companies of the United States
Business services companies established in 2005
American companies established in 2005